Ladies' Tango is a 1983 Soviet drama film directed by Sulambek Mamilov.

Plot 
The film tells about a woman named Valentina, who after her son's wedding went to the village and met there with the worker Fedor, whom she fell in love with. But Fedor, as it turned out, was married and had a daughter.

Cast 
 Valentina Fedotova
 Anatoly Vasilyev
 Raisa Ryazanova
 Leonid Nevedomsky	
 Nikolay Kryuchkov
 Mariya Skvortsova as Vlasyevna
 Boris Novikov
 Sergey Fyodorov
 Sergey Rubeko
 Yana Drouz

References

External links 
 

1983 films
1980s Russian-language films
Soviet drama films
1983 drama films